U17 or U-17 may refer to:

 German submarine U-17, one of several German submarines
 Cessna U-17, military model of Cessna 185
 FIFA U-17 World Cup, football (soccer) championship for boys under 17 years
 FIFA U-17 Women's World Cup, football (soccer) championship for girls under 17 years
 For the U17 Bandy World Championship for boys, see Youth Bandy World Championship
 For the U17 Bandy World Championship for girls, see Bandy World Championship G-17
 Nonconvex great rhombicuboctahedron
 A comic website in China, 'U17' has the similar pronunciation with the Chinese words 'With the scent of mythical creatures'.